The 1926 Tour of Flanders was held in 1926.

General classification

Final general classification

References
Résultats sur siteducyclisme.net
Résultats sur cyclebase.nl

External links

Tour of Flanders
1926 in road cycling
1926 in Belgian sport